Depressaria colossella is a moth in the family Depressariidae. It was described by Aristide Caradja in 1920. It is found in Japan and the Russian Far East.

The wingspan is about 30 mm.

References

Moths described in 1920
Depressaria
Moths of Japan
Moths of Asia